Chlorosphaeropsis is a genus of algae, specifically of the Chlorosarcinales.

References

External links

Scientific references

Scientific databases

 AlgaeBase
 AlgaTerra database
 Index Nominum Genericorum

Chlorophyceae genera